Happy Hour is a studio album by the American punk rock band Youth Brigade, released in 1994. It was the band's first full-length studio album since their second album Sound & Fury, released 11 years earlier. However, in the 11 years they had released two EPs, as well as one album under the name The Brigade, when bassist/vocalist Adam Stern was on hiatus from the band for six years, from 1985 to 1991. The band supported the album with the "10 Years of BYO in Yer Face" tour.

Critical reception

AllMusic wrote that "the songs are speedy and socially conscious as usual, with that Southern California hardcore feel."

Track listing
All songs written by Shawn Stern and Mark Stern, except where noted.
 "All Style, No Substance" (Shawn Stern, Adam Stern) (2:24)
 "Better Without You" (4:03)
 "Punk Rock Mom" (2:07)
 "Guns Are For..." (Shawn Stern, Adam Stern) (2:03)
 "Let Me Be" (2:38)
 "It's Not Enough" (Shawn Stern) (2:36)
 "Alive By Machine" (Shawn Stern, Adam Stern) (2:45)
 "It Just Doesn't Matter" (2:29)
 "Wanted" (Shawn Stern) (3:21)
 "Volare" (Domenico Modugno, Mitchell Parish) (2:02)
 "Sad But True" (3:35)
 "This Is a Life" (Shawn Stern, Adam Stern) (2:31)
 "Deep Inside of Me" (2:05)

Personnel
 Shawn Stern − guitars, vocals
 Adam Stern − bass, vocals
 Mark Stern − drums, vocals

References

1994 albums
Youth Brigade (band) albums